Wyoming Highway 353 (WYO 353) is a  east-west Wyoming state road located in east-central Sublette County. WYO 353 provides travel between U.S. Route 191 (US 191) at Boulder to Big Sandy and eastern Sublette County.

Route description
Wyoming Highway 353 begins its western end at U.S. Route 191 in Boulder.
Highway 353 travels eastward from Boulder, and meets the East Fork River which it roughly parallels it for most of its length. WYO 353 turns southeasterly and will remain on that routing till its end. At 14.4 miles, the East Fork River is crossed and WYO 353 ends at Milepost 15.51 at an intersection with Sublette CR 118 and CR 133. CR 118 continues to Big Sandy.

Major intersections

See also

 List of state highways in Wyoming
 List of highways numbered 353

References

External links 

Wyoming State Routes 300-399
WYO 353 - US 191 to Sublette CR 118

Transportation in Sublette County, Wyoming
353